The 2003 Walsall Metropolitan Borough Council election took place on 1 May 2003 to elect members of Walsall Metropolitan Borough Council in the West Midlands, England. One third of the council was up for election and the council stayed under no overall control.

After the election, the composition of the council was
Labour 26
Conservative 25
Liberal Democrat 7
Vacant 2

Election result
Overall turnout at the election was 26.7%.

Ward results

References

2003 English local elections
2003
2000s in the West Midlands (county)